Yaw Buaben Asamoa is a Ghanaian politician and former member of the Seventh Parliament of the Fourth Republic of Ghana representing the Adentan Constituency in the Greater Accra Region on the ticket of the New Patriotic Party. He is currently the Director of Communications for the New Patriotic Party.

References

Ghanaian MPs 2017–2021
1964 births
Living people
New Patriotic Party politicians